Kodos may refer to:

 Kodos the Executioner, a character from the Star Trek episode "The Conscience of the King"
 Kodos of Kang and Kodos, a character from The Simpsons
 Warlord Kodos, a character from the Sonic the Hedgehog comic book

See also
 Kodo (disambiguation)